Andrey Kuznetsov was the defending champion but chose to compete at the 2013 Portugal Open.
Potito Starace was leading Alessandro Giannessi 6–2, 2–0 in the final before Giannessi retired.

Seeds

Draw

Finals

Top half

Bottom half

References
 Main Draw
 Qualifying Draw

Tennis Napoli Cupandnbsp;- Singles
2013 Singles